Balatonkenese is a little town in Veszprém county, Hungary, by the Lake Balaton.

External links 
 Street map (Hungarian)

References 

Populated places in Veszprém County